The Immediate Geographic Region of João Monlevade is one of the 3 immediate geographic regions in the Intermediate Geographic Region of Ipatinga, one of the 70 immediate geographic regions in the Brazilian state of Minas Gerais and one of the 509 of Brazil, created by the National Institute of Geography and Statistics (IBGE) in 2017.

Municipalities 
It comprises 6 municipalities:

 Bela Vista de Minas
 João Monlevade
 Nova Era
 Rio Piracicaba
 São Domingos do Prata
 São Gonçalo do Rio Abaixo

References 

Geography of Minas Gerais